Jean Gérault (8 May 1904 – 4 November 1988) was a French long-distance runner. He competed in the marathon at the 1928 Summer Olympics.

References

External links
 

1904 births
1988 deaths
Athletes (track and field) at the 1928 Summer Olympics
French male long-distance runners
French male marathon runners
Olympic athletes of France
20th-century French people